The 2019 Nigerian House of Representatives elections in Federal Capital Territory was held on February 23, 2019, to elect members of the House of Representatives to represent Federal Capital Territory, Nigeria.

Overview

Summary

Results

Abaji/Gwagwalada/Kwali/Kuje 
A total of 22 candidates registered with the Independent National Electoral Commission to contest in the election. PDP candidate Hassan Sokodabo Usman won the election, defeating APC Angulu Zakari Yamma and 20 other party candidates.

Amac/Bwari 
A total of 32 candidates registered with the Independent National Electoral Commission to contest in the election. PDP candidate Jiba Yohanna Micah won the election, defeating APC Pam Amanda Iyabode and 30 other party candidates.

References 

Federal Capital Territory House of Representatives elections
Federal Capital Territory